Clermeil is a loa who makes rivers flood their banks in Haitian Vodou. He is usually depicted as a white male.

Haitian Vodou gods
Sea and river gods